CK Infrastructure Holdings Limited (CKI), is the largest publicly listed infrastructure company in Hong Kong with diversified investments in energy infrastructure, transportation Infrastructure, water Infrastructure and infrastructure related business, parented by CK Hutchison Holdings, businessman Li Ka Shing's flagship company. It is a leading player in the global infrastructure arena in Hong Kong, Mainland China, Australia, New Zealand, the United Kingdom, Continental Europe and North America. The chairman is Victor Li, the elder son of Li Ka Shing.

CKI is currently a Hang Seng Index Constituent Stock (bluechip).

On 30 July 2010, CK Infrastructure, the former Hongkong Electric Holdings (subsequently renamed Power Assets Holdings Limited in February 2011) and the Li Ka Shing Foundation announced the acquisition of three UK electricity networks business from Électricité de France.

On 20 January 2015, CK Infrastructure Holdings announced the acquisition of British company Eversholt Rail Group for £2.5 billion (US$3.79 billion).

In September 2018, Australia Antitrust Regulator cleared CK Infrastructure to acquire APA Group of Australia for $9 billion.

Assets
The following list is some of the companies that CK Infrastructure and its subsidiary Power Assets Holdings hold at least a 50% share in:
United Kingdom
Northern Gas Networks Limited
Northumbrian Water Group
Seabank Power Station
Southern Water
Wales & West Utilities
UK Power Networks
UK Rails Group
Australia
Australian Gas Networks
Citipower
Dampier Bunbury Pipeline
Powercor
Multinet Gas
SA Power Networks
United Energy
New Zealand
Wellington Electricity
Hong Kong and Mainland China
Shantou Bay Bridge
Green Island Cement

Chairmen 

 Victor Li (1996– )

References

External links
 
 

Companies listed on the Hong Kong Stock Exchange
CK Hutchison Holdings
Former companies in the Hang Seng Index
Construction and civil engineering companies of Hong Kong